Music from the Motion Picture is an album by 10,000 Maniacs. The album, their first full-length in 14 years, contains eleven original songs.  This album is the first to feature guitarist Jeff Erickson since he took over for Robert Buck following his death in 2000, and the first Maniacs album to feature Mary Ramsey without her longtime music partner, John Lombardo.  In addition to his guitar efforts, Erickson provides the first male lead vocals on a Maniacs song since John Lombardo's vocal on the Human Conflict Number Five album of 1982. As with 1999's The Earth Pressed Flat and the following 2015 album Twice Told Tales, the album did not chart in either the US or the UK.

Track listing

 "I Don't Love You Too" (Dennis Drew) – 3:56
 "When We Walked on Clouds" (Drew) – 5:25
 "Gold" (Drew, Jeff Erickson) – 3:31
 "Triangles" (Drew, Mary Ramsey) – 5:26
 "Live for the Time of Your Life" (Drew, Ramsey) – 3:31
 "Whippoorwill" (Ramsey) – 3:57
 "It's a Beautiful Life" (Traditional; arranged by 10,000 Maniacs) – 4:32
 "Fine Line" (Erickson) – 3:53
 "Tiny Arrows" (Drew) – 6:22
 "Downhill" (Drew) – 3:48
 "Chautauqua Moon" (Ramsey) – 2:59

Personnel

10,000 Maniacs
Jerome Augustyniak – percussion, drums, vocals
Dennis Drew – organ, keyboards, vocals on track 10
Jeff Erickson – guitar, vocals on tracks 3 & 8
Steve Gustafson – bass guitar, vocals
Mary Ramsey – violin, viola, vocals

Additional musicians
John Merino – finger style guitar on track 2
David Hone – additional programming and keyboards

Additional album credits
Produced by 10,000 Maniacs
Directed by Steven Gustafson
Recorded & Mixed by David Hone
Recorded at the Robert Lee Scharmann Theatre & FM Studios in Jamestown NY
Additional Recording & Mixing at AllSound Media in Warren PA
Mastered by Gavin Lurssen at Lurssen Mastering in Los Angeles, CA
Producer Credits: Andreas Laemmermann, Adam Zeitz, Stephen Monroe, Julie Gochenour, Donald Semmens, Flavio Louzada Graciano, Harvey Kivel, Henry Houh, Murry Galloway, Charissa and James Campbell, Alan Cohen, Maggie Marlowe, Betty Cheung, Pedro Javier Serra Serrano, Myra Vignovic Blasius, James Lawrence
10,000 Maniacs Crew: Scott Barton, Colin Braeger
Touring guitarist & vocalist: Melanie Luciano
Managed Care: Gehrig Peterson

References

10,000 Maniacs albums
2013 albums
Self-released albums